Lajos Kürthy (born 22 October 1986) is a Hungarian shot putter. He was successful as a junior athlete, specializing in the discus throw. He later shifted to the shot put. His personal best is 20.32 metres, achieved in June 2008 in Pécs.

Achievements

References

1986 births
Living people
Hungarian male shot putters
Hungarian male discus throwers
Athletes (track and field) at the 2008 Summer Olympics
Athletes (track and field) at the 2012 Summer Olympics
Olympic athletes of Hungary
21st-century Hungarian people